Maplewood in Christian County, Kentucky, located off Mason Lane near Pembroke, Kentucky was built around 1820.  It was listed on the National Register of Historic Places in 1979.

It was built originally as a one-story, five-bay brick house; a two-bay extension to the south and a kitchen ell to the west were added later.  It has Federal style sidelights

References

National Register of Historic Places in Christian County, Kentucky
Federal architecture in Kentucky
Houses completed in 1820
Houses on the National Register of Historic Places in Kentucky
1820 establishments in Kentucky
Houses in Christian County, Kentucky